The 2014 Prix de l'Arc de Triomphe was a horse race held at Longchamp on Sunday, 5 October 2014. It was the 93rd running of the Prix de l'Arc de Triomphe.

The winner was Al Shaqab Racing's Treve, a four-year-old filly trained in France by Criquette Head-Maarek and ridden by Thierry Jarnet, repeating her victory in 2013. She became the first horse since Alleged to win the race twice. Treve's victory gave Head her third win in the race and was a record-equaling fourth success for Jarnet.

The contenders
The 2013 winner Treve returned and attracted some support, despite having been beaten in all three of her races in 2014. The most fancied of the French runners were the three-year-olds Ectot, winner of the Prix Niel and the unbeaten filly Avenir Certain winner of the Poule d'Essai des Pouliches and the Prix de Diane. The other French contenders included Flintshire (2013 Grand Prix de Paris), Dolniya (Prix de Malleret), Prince of Gibraltar (2013 Critérium de Saint-Cloud) and Spiritjim (disqualified after winning the Grand Prix de Saint-Cloud). There were three runners from Japan, headed by the Dubai Duty Free winner Just A Way who was moving up in distance. The other Japanese runners were the multiple Grade I winner Gold Ship and the filly Harp Star who had won the Oka Sho and recorded an upset win over Gold Ship at Sapporo in August. Britain was represented by Taghrooda, a three-year-old filly who had won the Epsom Oaks and King George VI and Queen Elizabeth Stakes, the St Leger winner Kingston Hill and the six-year-old Al Kazeem, winner of the 2013 Eclipse Stakes who had been returned to racing after an unsuccessful spell at stud. There were three runners from Ireland, all from the Ballydoyle stable: Ruler of the World who had won the 2013 Epsom Derby and returned to form with a win in the Prix Foy, Tapestry who had recorded an upset win over Taghrooda in the Yorkshire Oaks and Chicquita, winner of the Irish Oaks in 2013. Germany was represented by the four-year-old Ivanhowe, who had defeated Sea The Moon (who had been ante-post favourite for the Arc) in the Grosser Preis von Baden. Taghrooda was sent off the 5.5/1 favourite, ahead of Avenir Certain (6/1), Ectot (6.7/1), Harp Star (6.9/1), and Just A Way (8/1) with Treve starting at odds of 14.4/1.

The race
Ruler of the World started quickly, but was soon overtaken by Montviron, the pacemaker for Ectot.	

Flintshire, Taghrooda and Kingston Hill stayed on well, and Harp Star made rapid progress on the wide outside from a seemingly impossible position, but none of them were able to mount a serious challenge to the leader. Treve won by two lengths from Flintshire with Taghrooda in third ahead of Kingston Hill, Dolniya and Harp Star.

Race details
 Sponsor: Qatar Racing and Equestrian Club
 Purse: €5,000,000
 Going: Good
 Distance: 2,400 metres
 Number of runners: 20
 Winner's time: 2:26.05

Full result

 Abbreviations: ns = nose; shd = short-head; hd = head; snk = short neck; nk = neck

Winner's details
Further details of the winner, Treve
 Sex: filly
 Foaled: 7 April 2010
 Country: France
 Sire: Motivator
 Owner: Al Shaqab Racing
 Breeder: Haras du Quesnay

Subsequent breeding careers
Leading progeny of participants in the 2014 Prix de l'Arc de Triomphe.

Sires of Group/Grade One winners
Ruler of the World (9th)
 Iridessa – 1st Fillies' Mile (2018), 1st Matron Stakes, 1st Pretty Polly Stakes (Ireland), 1st Breeders' Cup Filly & Mare Turf (2019)
Al Kazeem (10th)
 Aspetar – 1st Preis von Europa (2019)

Other Stallions
Just A Way (8th) – Velox (2nd Satsuki Shō 2019)Kingston Hill (4th) – Minor flat winnersPrince Gibraltar (7th) – Minor flat winnersGold Ship (14th) – Minor winners in JapanHarp Star (6th) – Minor runner in JapanFlintshire (2nd) – Exported to America – Offspring yet to raceEctot (17th) – Offspring yet to raceIvanhowe (18th) – Offspring yet to raceFree Port Lux (19th) – Offspring yet to race

Broodmares
Chicquita (15th) – Secret Thoughts (3rd Silver Flash Stakes 2018)Taghrooda (3rd) – Minor flat winnerTapestry (13th) – Minor flat winnerAvenir Certain (11th) – Exported to Japan – Minor runnerTreve (1st) – Offspring yet to raceDolniya (5th) – Offspring yet to raceSiljan's Saga (12th) – Offspring yet to race

References

External links
 Colour Chart – Arc 2014

Prix de l'Arc de Triomphe
 2014
Prix de l'Arc de Triomphe
Prix de l'Arc de Triomphe
Prix de l'Arc de Triomphe